Marian Hadenko (15 September 1955 – 3 December 2021) was a Ukrainian composer, singer and television presenter. He was a recipient of the Merited Artist of Ukraine (1997) and the People's Artist of Ukraine (1999).

References

External links 
 

1955 births
2021 deaths
Ukrainian composers
Ukrainian male singers
Ukrainian television presenters
20th-century Ukrainian singers
21st-century Ukrainian singers
People from Storozhynets
Recipients of the title of Merited Artist of Ukraine